Aaron Dell (born May 4, 1989) is a Canadian professional ice hockey goaltender for the San Jose Barracuda of the American Hockey League (AHL) while under contract to the San Jose Sharks of the National Hockey League (NHL). Undrafted, Dell has previously played for the New Jersey Devils and Buffalo Sabres.

Playing career
Dell played collegiate hockey at the University of North Dakota. Dell returned to the Allen Americans in trade from the Utah Grizzlies on October 11, 2014. While with the Worcester Sharks, on March 1, 2015, Dell was signed to a one-year entry-level contract with the team's NHL affiliate, the San Jose Sharks, for the remainder of the season.

In the 2016–17 season, Dell made the Sharks' opening night roster as the team's backup goaltender to Martin Jones. On October 18, 2016, Dell made his NHL debut and won against the New York Islanders. On February 28, 2018, Dell signed a two-year contract extension with the Sharks.

On October 13, 2020, Dell signed a one-year $800,000 contract with the Toronto Maple Leafs as a free agent. After attending the Maple Leafs training camp for the pandemic delayed 2020–21 season, Dell was included in the team's taxi squad. On January 18, 2021, Dell's brief tenure with the Maple Leafs ended as he was claimed off waivers by the New Jersey Devils.

On July 28, 2021, Dell signed as a free agent to a one-year, $750,000 contract with the Buffalo Sabres. On September 13, Buffalo announced that Dell will wear jersey no. 30, a move that upset many fans as the number had not been issued since Ryan Miller's departure from the team in 2014.

On January 25, 2022, during a game against the Ottawa Senators, Dell delivered an unprovoked hit to forward Drake Batherson, causing an ankle injury; as a result, Batherson was ruled out for the 2022 NHL All-Star Game which he was supposed to attend. The following day, Dell was suspended three games for the hit, officially ruled as interference.

As a free agent from the Sabres, Dell returned to his original club, the San Jose Sharks, after agreeing to a one-year, two-way contract on July 13, 2022.

Records
 2010–11: Holds UND school record for most wins in a season (30), surpassing previous record holder Ed Belfour (29)
 2014–15: Holds Worcester Sharks record for GAA at 2.06 and SAV%.927 and tied with Alex Stalock with four shutouts.

Career statistics

Awards and honours

References

External links

1989 births
Living people
Abbotsford Heat players
AHCA Division I men's ice hockey All-Americans
Allen Americans players
Binghamton Devils players
Buffalo Sabres players
Calgary Canucks players
Canadian expatriate ice hockey players in the United States
Canadian ice hockey goaltenders
Ice hockey people from Alberta
New Jersey Devils players
North Dakota Fighting Hawks men's ice hockey players
People from Airdrie, Alberta
Rochester Americans players
San Jose Barracuda players
San Jose Sharks players
Undrafted National Hockey League players
Utah Grizzlies (ECHL) players
Worcester Sharks players